The Goodwood Festival of Speed is an annual motorsports festival featuring modern and historic motor racing vehicles taking part in a hill climb and other events, held in the grounds of Goodwood House, West Sussex, England, in late June or early July; the event is scheduled to avoid clashing with the Formula One season, enabling fans to see F1 machines as well as cars and motorbikes from motor racing history climb the hill.

In the early years of the Festival, tens of thousands attended over the weekend. As of 2014 it attracted crowds of around 100,000 on each of the three days it was held. A record crowd of 158,000 attended in 2003, before an advance-ticket-only admission policy came into force; attendance was subsequently capped at 150,000.

History

Founding
The Goodwood Festival of Speed was founded in 1993 by Lord March in order to bring motor racing back to the Goodwood estate — a location steeped in British motor racing history. Shortly after taking over the estate in the early 1990s, Lord March (who later became Duke of Richmond) wanted to bring back motor racing to Goodwood Circuit, but did not have the necessary permit to host a race there. Therefore, he instead hosted it on his own grounds.

With a small selection of entrants made up of invited historic vehicles, the first event that took place on Sunday 20 June proved to be a success, taking in a crowd of 25,000 despite a date clash with the 24 Hours of Le Mans that year. After the second event also clashed with Le Mans, Lord March would ensure that the event would never be allowed to clash with either Le Mans or Formula One races.

In 1994, Saturday was added, making it a weekend event. In 1996, Friday was added, making it a three-day event. In 2010, the Moving Motor Show was added on the Thursday. The 2020 event was cancelled then later run in October combined with events at Goodwood Motor Circuit, without spectators, but streamed online and shown on terrestrial TV. The event was modified to incorporate historic cars from the Revival, rally/sprint cars from the Member's Meeting, and an attempt to set a new track record.

Features and attractions

Hillclimb

The event is classified as a hill climb and visitors are accorded close access to that part of the track. The 1890 m track climbs 92.7 metres (has average gradient of 4.9%). Its record time was set in 2022 by Max Chilton in an electric McMurtry Automotive car at 39.081 seconds. The record time for a Formula 1 car is 41.6 seconds by Nick Heidfeld in 1999 in a McLaren MP4/13. For safety reasons Formula 1 cars can no longer do official timed runs so instead perform demonstrations.

In 2016 to commemorate 40 years since James Hunt won the F1 World Championship, McLaren invited Bruno Senna to speed a P1 GTR up the course.

Soapbox challenge
From 2000 to 2004 the Soapbox Challenge was a downhill race for gravity-powered cars. Starting from just below the hill-climb finish line, to a finish line in front of the house. It included entries from Cosworth, Prodrive, and other top companies.  With some famous riders/drivers piloting them, including Barry Sheene. However, there were frequent accidents. Despite an official cap on the cost of cars, the unofficial costs were becoming too high, so it did not return in 2005. However, it did return in 2013. Companies such as Bentley and McLaren competed.

Forest Rally Stage

From 2005 to present there has been a demonstration area for the rally cars at the top of the hill.
Initially, in 2005, the track through the forest was widened, and the rally cars ran down through the forest, turned on the tarmac section just outside the wood, and returned up the same track. This meant that the cars could only run one-at-a-time.

In 2006, a full forest stage was introduced, designed by Hannu Mikkola this was a complete circuit, with a separate start and finish line at the top of the wood. This allowed the cars to start at timed intervals, allowing many more cars to run. Ever since its inception Southern Car Club have been entrusted with the organization of the rally stage, held under an MSA permit.

Michelin Supercar Paddock
Since 2000, there has been a supercar paddock (formerly sponsored by Microsoft Windows and The Times), for road-going supercars. Since 2014 cars could opt to do a timed run. It is now common for specialty car manufacturers to show off their latest sports model, including newly released mass-produced sports models and working concept models.

The Arena
The Arena is a new for 2019 attraction that showcases drifting and stunt driving. It is a large tarmac area that used to contain the Michelin Supercar Paddock, with 2 barrel donuts and 2 wall rides with a large viewing area just above the drift paddock. Spectators can watch stunt shows throughout the course of the day, the drift competition, and the hillclimb shootout on the big screen.

Future Lab
Officially the future science and technology pavilion at the Festival since 2017. Several major global reveals have debuted as part of this exhibition, including autonomous trucks by Einride, prototype flying cars like Airspeeder and autonomous delivery vehicle kar-go.

Cartier Style et Luxe
Since 1995 this is an auto show which takes place to the west of the house. It is a similar format to the Pebble Beach Concours d'Elegance. Entry is usually by invitation, and this provides some leeway as to which type of vehicle can enter, usually resulting in a more varied event than usual Concours d'Elegance. Unlike most concours shows, the Cartier Style et Luxe is judged by a panel of selected judges consisting of celebrities from all around the world to car designers.

Moving Motor Show
From 2010 until 2018, the Moving Motor Show, was added. Mainly in response to the cancellation of the British International Motor Show aimed exclusively for buyers of new cars, allowing them a chance to test the cars on the course. Following its success, it was announced the MMS would return in 2011.

The 2010 event also included the running of the new McLaren MP4-12C.

The official website listed the Festival of speed dates as the Friday to Sunday, but the weekend tickets for the Festival included a moving motor show ticket.From 2019 the Festival of Speed has been a four day event with no moving motor show. So it's not strictly part of the Festival of Speed, but it is a part of the Festival of Speed weekend.

Other
Other popular attractions at the event are the real life replicas of the Wacky Races cars (Thursday was known as Press preview day, then incorporated The Moving Motor Show), which serves to provide lunchtime entertainment for the crowds, and the airshows, which usually include the RAF Tornado and Red Arrows, and in 2004 and 2005 a low-flying Boeing 747; a low-flying Airbus A380 appeared at the 2008 event.

From the festival's beginning, poster art had been illustrated by renowned motor racing artist Peter Hearsey until his retirement in 2015. In 2016, the poster art was designed by Klaus Wagger, who rose to prominence as a racing artist when he won a competition to design the official poster for Mille Miglia in 2000.

In recent years, they have also put on the GAS Arena (Goodwood Action Sports) who showcase extreme stunts such as Freestyle Motorcross, BMX and Trial bike Riding 

In 2018, for the first time at the Festival - as part of the Future Lab exhibition  - a driverless Roborace racing car negotiated the course, and a virtual passenger seat experience was made available online. In 2019, the car made an official run in 66.96 seconds.

Other events
The Festival of Speed has a sister event, the Goodwood Revival Meeting. This event, normally held in early September, relives the glory days of motor racing at the Goodwood Motor Racing Circuit.

Incidents
There have been two fatal accidents at the event.

The first was during its inaugural meeting in 1993, when vintage racing motorcyclist Chas Guy was killed in practice following the completion of the course when his Vincent motorcycle developed a steering wobble known as a tank slapper, throwing the rider into a tree. Since then, motorcycles are not timed for their run.

In 2000, driver John Dawson-Damer lost control of his Lotus 63, and crashed into the finish line gantry, killing himself and marshal Andrew Carpenter. Another marshal, Steve Tarrant, survived but sustained serious injuries to the lower part of his right leg.

Central display
Aston Martin set up a central display for the first FOS in 1993. Since 1997, the display erected on the lawn in front of Goodwood House has been designed by the sculptor Gerry Judah. The displays honoured car marques until 2017, when for the first time it honoured a career, that of Bernie Ecclestone. This is a list of the temporary monuments:

Hillclimb Shootout Winners
The Hill Climb Shootout or The Sunday Shootout, is an event during the Goodwood Festival of Speed in which a selection of drivers with the fastest Hillclimb times of the weekend compete to get to the finish line the fastest.

Source:

Appearance in media
Goodwood Festival of Speed event is available in Gran Turismo 6 and the track is available in Gran Turismo Sport and Gran Turismo 7. Sky Sports gives live coverage throughout the weekend and ITV show the highlights.  it is also streamed on YouTube.

References

External links

 

Goodwood estate
Motorsport venues in England
Sport in West Sussex
Recurring events established in 1993
Historic motorsport events
Hillclimbs
Sports festivals in the United Kingdom
1993 establishments in England